Duffield railway station serves the village of Duffield in Derbyshire, England. It is also a junction with the former branch line to Wirksworth, which is now operated as the Ecclesbourne Valley heritage railway.

The unmanned station is served by East Midlands Railway, who operate local services from Derby to Matlock via the Derwent Valley Line.

History
The first station at Duffield was built in 1841, a year after the line opened, by the North Midland Railway a few yards further north from its present position.

From 1840 there had been a number of proposals for a line from Manchester down the Churnet Valley to meet either the Birmingham and Derby Junction Railway or the Midland Counties Railway, and then go on to London. An amendment was put forward in 1844 bringing the line to the North Midland at Duffield, presumably via Ashbourne and the Ecclesbourne Valley. However, the line never materialised.

The Midland Railway, however, was looking for a path into Manchester as an alternative to the former Manchester, Buxton, Matlock and Midlands Junction Railway from Ambergate to Rowsley which it leased jointly with the LNWR. It built a junction at Duffield and began to construct the line, which opened as far as Wirksworth in 1867. When the MR gained sole control of the Ambergate line in 1871, the extension proved unnecessary. However, the Wirksworth branch remained a busy line with a regular passenger service and freight in the form of limestone from Wirksworth and milk from the farms along the line.

In 1867 a large new station was built in the vee of the junction, with platforms on each side of the double track. A signal box was provided to the east of the main line, replaced by Duffield Junction box around 1890 at the south end of Platform One. By this time the population of Duffield had increased with railway workers and management, as had traffic on the main line. In 1897 a goods line was laid in the up (southbound) direction, and a fourth, down goods, laid in 1904.

At this stage there were two platforms with a footbridge, the second being an island between the two passenger lines, and another for the branch. The two subsidiary platforms each had a waiting room, while the main platform building contained the waiting room, ticket and luggage offices.  Next to the footbridge was a separate W.H. Smith bookstall. The station master's house was separate, being beside the track to the north, and there was small luggage store just outside the gate. The Wirksworth branch having severed the main road, which had been diverted, a footbridge gave access across the line. To the north of the station, there was a wide level crossing which, besides allowing luggage trolleys to cross, gave access for the farmer who owned the adjacent land. Next to this was a footbridge from the front of the station to the field behind, and between them two signal posts with, until 1910, a Duffield Station signal box supplementing Duffield Junction. After that, the station changed little over the years until 1969 though in 1947, at the time passenger services were withdrawn on the Wirksworth branch, the signal posts were replaced with a fabricated steel gantry and upper-quadrant signals. Some time later the passenger footbridge was rebuilt in brick, using the existing walkway.

In the 1960s the station became unstaffed, and the buildings were removed in 1969 except for the station master's house which became a private residence, and the small luggage store which was just outside the gate. However these have also subsequently been demolished.

In July 2005 the station was adopted by WyvernRail plc under a scheme promoted by the Friends of the Derwent Valley Line. WyvernRail undertook to provide care and maintenance of Duffield railway station on behalf of Central Trains (who operated the station at that time) and continue to do so for East Midlands Railway.

Stationmasters

Samuel Jennings ca. 1851 ca. 1860 ca. 1867
J. Skinner until 1877
George E. Aldred 1877 - 1879 (formerly station master at Denby)
Frederick Perry  1879 - 1908
Wlliam Cope 1909 - 1922 (formerly station master at Spondon, afterwards station master at Ashby de la Zouch)
W. Clements 1922 - 1924 (afterwards station master at Apperley Bridge)
J.G. Goss 1924 - 1931 (formerly station master at Bamford)
J. Townson 1931 - 1933 (formerly station master at Great Longstone)
J.W. Walker 1933 - ca. 1944
George Henry Hill ca. 1955

Duffield station as it was

Services

National Rail
National Rail services at Duffield are operated by East Midlands Railway.

Saturdays also have an hourly service but all the trains originate or end in Derby.

On Sundays, there is a two-hourly service between Matlock and Nottingham in the morning, with services increasing to hourly from mid-afternoon onwards.

For journeys beginning at Duffield, the full range of tickets for travel for any destination in the country may be purchased from the guard on the train at no extra cost. It is a penalty fare station however, so a permit to travel must be bought from the machine installed on the Derby-bound side of the platform before joining the train.

Ecclesbourne Valley Railway

The Ecclesbourne Valley Railway runs from Duffield station Platform 3 to Ravenstor via Hazelwood, Shottle, Idridgehay and Wirksworth along the route of the old Midland Railway branch which closed to passengers in 1947 and goods in 1989.

This link was re-opened to passengers in April 2011, allowing heritage services from Wirksworth to connect with the Midland Main Line. Through ticketing is available from all main line stations.

References

Pixton, B., (2000) North Midland: Portrait of a Famous Route, Cheltenham: Runpast Publishing

External links

The Ecclesbourne Valley Railway - Opening the line from Wirksworth to Duffield Platform 3
"Picture the Past" Duffield Station in 1966

Railway stations in Derbyshire
DfT Category F2 stations
Former Midland Railway stations
Railway stations in Great Britain opened in 1841
Railway stations in Great Britain closed in 1867
Railway stations in Great Britain opened in 1867
Railway stations served by East Midlands Railway